Abū’l-‘Abbās al-Faḍl ibn Ḥātim al-Nairīzī (922) was a Persian mathematician and astronomer from Nayriz, Fars Province, Iran.

He flourished under al-Mu'tadid, Caliph from 892 to 902, and compiled astronomical tables, writing a book for al-Mu'tadid on atmospheric phenomena.

Nayrizi wrote commentaries on Ptolemy and Euclid. The latter were translated by the 12th century Italian scholar Gerard of Cremona. Nairizi used the so-called , the equivalent to the tangent, as a genuine trigonometric line, but he was anticipated in this by the Persian astronomer al-Marwazi.

He wrote a treatise on the spherical astrolabe, which is very elaborate and seems to be the best Persian work on the subject. It is divided into four books:

Historical and critical introduction.
Description of the spherical astrolabe; its superiority over plane astrolabes and all other astronomical instruments.
Applications.
Applications.

He gave a proof of the Pythagorean theorem using the Pythagorean tiling.

Ibn al-Nadim mentions Nayrizi as a distinguished astronomer with eight works by him listed in his book al-Fihrist.

References

Sources

Further reading
  (PDF version)

External links
The (fragmentary) text of Nairizi's commentary on Euclid I. PDF scans from the edition of Codex Leidensis 399 (Classical Arabic)

 

Scientists who worked on qibla determination
9th-century Iranian mathematicians
10th-century Iranian mathematicians
860s births
922 deaths
Year of birth uncertain
Mathematicians from the Abbasid Caliphate
Astronomers from the Abbasid Caliphate
Astronomers of the medieval Islamic world
People from Fars Province
10th-century Iranian astronomers
9th-century Iranian astronomers